Volnoye is a rural locality (a selo) and the administrative center of Volnenskoye Rural Settlement of Koshekhablsky District, Adygea, Russia. The population of this village was 3595 as of 2018. There are 37 streets.

Geography 
The village is located on the left bank of the Laba River, 38 km south of Koshekhabl (the district's administrative centre) by road. Labinsk is the nearest rural locality.

References 

Rural localities in Koshekhablsky District